René-Marie Ehuzu (12 April 1944 – 17 October 2012) was the Roman Catholic bishop of the Roman Catholic Diocese of Porto Novo, Benin, from 2007 until his death in 2012.

He had previously been Bishop of Abomey in Benin from 2002.

Ordained as a priest in 1972, Ehuzu was named bishop in 2002; he was consecrated a bishop by Pope John Paul II on 6 January 2002; he died while still in office.

Notes

1944 births
2012 deaths
21st-century Roman Catholic bishops in Benin
Roman Catholic bishops of Porto Novo
Roman Catholic bishops of Abomey